Connor Bedard (born July 17, 2005) is a Canadian junior ice hockey centre and captain of the Regina Pats of the Western Hockey League (WHL). Bedard was selected by the Regina Pats first overall in the WHL Bantam Draft in 2020 as the first WHL player of exceptional status, and won the Jim Piggott Memorial Trophy as the league's top rookie player in his debut season. Bedard will be eligible for the 2023 NHL Entry Draft and is projected to be picked first overall.

Competing internationally for Canada, Bedard won championships with the Canadian national under-18 team in 2021 and with the Canadian national junior team in 2022 and 2023. His 2023 tournament performance set several national and international points records, and led to his being named the event's most valuable player.

Playing career

Early years
In 2018, Bedard emerged as a young hockey prospect, being named "The Future of Hockey" in an article by The Hockey News. Bedard played minor hockey with West Vancouver Academy Prep of the Canadian Sport School Hockey League. While playing with this school's U15 and U18 teams, Bedard led the league in goals and points and was named Most Valuable Player both years.

Regina Pats (2020–present)
In March 2020, Bedard was granted exceptional status by Hockey Canada, allowing him to enter the major junior-level Canadian Hockey League component leagues a year early. In the WHL Bantam Draft in 2020, Bedard was selected first overall by the Regina Pats as the first ever Western Hockey League (WHL) player of exceptional status. In September 2020, Bedard was loaned to the HV71 junior hockey system, where he played until the WHL returned to play for its 2020–21 season beginning in March 2021. As a rookie in the WHL, Bedard scored 12 goals and 16 assists for 28 points in just 15 games before leaving for the 2021 IIHF World U18 Championships, as a result of which he was named the Western Hockey League's East Division rookie of the year and subsequently awarded the Jim Piggott Memorial Trophy as the WHL's rookie of the year. 

During the 2021–22 WHL season, Bedard became the youngest player ever to score 50 or more goals in a season, managing his 50th and 51st goals in the last game of the regular season. He finished the year with 51 goals and 49 assists for an even 100 points, ranking second in the WHL in goals and fourth in points. He was only the third 16-year-old to manage a 100-point season in the WHL, and the first to do so in the 21st century. As he attended the 2022 NHL Entry Draft as an observer, Bedard was profiled in The New York Times as "the most exciting future NHL player attending this week’s draft."

After not recording a point in his opening game of the 2022–23 season, Bedard embarked on a lengthy points streak that propelled him to first place in the WHL's standings. On November 17, he became the first WHL player in a decade to record twenty-game point streaks in consecutive seasons. Bedard's presence was noted for attracting large crowds for the Pats' road games, with his first-ever return to greater Vancouver for a game against the Vancouver Giants drawing over 5000 fans, nearly double the Giants' season average. Despite missing eleven games in December and early January while attending the World Junior Championships, Bedard still led the WHL in scoring upon his return to the lineup on January 8, where he had four goals and two assists in a 6–2 home victory over the Calgary Hitmen.

With the Regina Pats not considered an especially competitive team, and Bedard considered a virtual certainty to play in the NHL the following year, there was some media discussion in advance of the WHL's 2023 trade deadline whether the Pats should seek to trade him to a contending team in exchange for future assets. Pats general manager John Paddock strongly denied there was any prospect of such a trade, noting in addition that per WHL rules Bedard would have to consent to be traded, and "Connor has the final say. He wants to be a Regina Pat and finish his career in Regina, clear?" Ultimately the trade deadline passed without any transaction.

While Bedard's status as an audience draw was already apparent earlier in the season, this effect ramped up noticeably following his return from the 2023 World Junior Championships, which had significantly elevated his national profile. A January road trip through the province of Alberta saw team record attendance (7,287) at the Red Deer Rebels' Peavey Mart Centrium, while Medicine Hat Tigers' sellout of their arena saw more than double their average attendance. The Lethbridge Hurricanes offered standing-room only at the Enmax Centre. The Pats played a nationally-televised game against the Hitmen in the Saddledome, the home of the NHL's Calgary Flames. The Saddledome's upper seating was made available for the occasion, resulting in a near-record WHL attendance of 17,223 when the Hitmen's seasonal average was only 3500.

2023 NHL Entry Draft
Bedard attracted considerable interest as a future high selection in the National Hockey League draft from an early age, speculation that was accelerated by his being granted exceptional status to play in the WHL. Much of the early conversation two years in advance of the 2023 NHL Entry Draft involved a debate of his merits versus those of Russian winger Matvei Michkov, also considered a budding top talent with the same initial draft eligibility. Following their dueling appearances on their respective countries' national teams at the 2021 IIHF World U18 Championships and the abortive initial edition of the 2022 World Junior Championships, many in the media suggested a career rivalry between them comparable to that between Russian 2004 first overall pick Alexander Ovechkin and Canadian 2005 first overall pick Sidney Crosby. However, following Michkov's signing of a multi-year contract extension with his KHL club SKA Saint Petersburg, as well as geopolitical uncertainties resultant from the Russo-Ukrainian War, it was widely presumed that Bedard would be picked first in the draft.

Entering his draft year as the consensus choice to be taken first overall, much of the debate around Bedard's future concerned whether he warranted being considered a "generational" talent, comparable to Crosby, Ovechkin and Connor McDavid. A number of NHL teams, notably the Chicago Blackhawks and Arizona Coyotes, were said to be openly tanking the 2022–23 season in the hopes of obtaining favourable odds in the draft lottery. ESPN remarked that fans of "potential lottery teams have adopted some variation of 'Fail/Tank/Lose Hard for Bedard' as a 2022–23 battle cry."

International play

 

In April and May 2021, Bedard played for the Canada men's national under-18 ice hockey team in the 2021 IIHF World U18 Championships in Frisco, Texas, winning a gold medal, tying for second in the tournament in points and earning a spot on the media all-star team.

On December 12, 2021, Bedard became the seventh 16-year-old to be selected by Canada for the World Junior Ice Hockey Championships. Initially the thirteenth forward in the lineup, by the end of the team's first game he had been elevated to the top six. Bedard scored four goals in an 11–2 victory over Austria, breaking Wayne Gretzky's record for most goals by a 16-year-old at the championships, and tying the overall Canadian record for most goals in a single World Junior game. The spread of the Omicron variant thereafter forced the suspension of the World Junior Championships. It was subsequently announced that the event would be rebooted in August of 2022.

On April 18, 2022, Bedard was named to the Canadian team for the 2022 IIHF World U18 Championships, the only returning player from the previous year's championship team. He scored a hat trick in the second game of the tournament, an 8–3 victory over Germany, breaking Shane Wright's record for  Canada goal-scoring at the U18 Championships, and simultaneously breaking Mathew Barzal's Canada points record. Later in the summer, at the revived World Junior Championships, Bedard again played for Canada, attracting considerable attention for his shot. He recorded four goals and four assists over the course of the seven-game tournament, winning gold with Canada.

On December 12, 2022, Bedard was named to the Canadian national team to compete at the 2023 World Junior Ice Hockey Championships. Scoring the opening goal in the quarter-final match against Slovakia saw Bedard break the Canadian record for career goals and points at the tournament. He also set a new world record for World Junior points by a player under the age of 19, previously held by Czech player Jaromír Jágr. Bedard's game-winning goal, scored in overtime, was called an "indelible stamp" on the tournament. He recorded nine goals and fourteen assists during the seven-game tournament, winning gold with Canada for the second consecutive year. Bedard was named the championships' best forward by the IIHF directorate, as well as to the media all-star team and as the most valuable player of the event.

Career statistics

Regular season and playoffs

International

The initial 2022 World Junior Championships was cancelled due to the COVID-19 pandemic; however the scoring from that tournament was still counted.

Awards and honours

References

External links
 

2005 births
Living people
Canadian expatriate ice hockey players in Sweden
Canadian ice hockey centres
Ice hockey people from British Columbia
Regina Pats players
Sportspeople from North Vancouver
21st-century Canadian people